Sara Ballantyne may refer to:
 Sara Ballantyne (field hockey) (born 1964), Canadian field hockey player
 Sara Ballantyne (cyclist) (born 1960), American cross-country mountain biker